SMS  was the last armored cruiser built by the German Empire. She was designed to match what German intelligence incorrectly believed to be the specifications of the British s.  was larger than preceding armored cruisers and carried more heavy guns, but was unable to match the size and armament of the battlecruisers which replaced armored cruisers in the British Royal Navy and German Imperial Navy. The ship was named after the Prussian Field Marshal Gebhard von Blücher, the commander of Prussian forces at the Battle of Waterloo in 1815.

 was built at the Kaiserliche Werft shipyard in Kiel between 1907 and 1909, and commissioned on 1 October 1909. The ship served in the I Scouting Group for most of her career, including the early portion of World War I. She took part in the operation to bombard Yarmouth and the raid on Scarborough, Hartlepool and Whitby in 1914.

At the Battle of Dogger Bank on 24 January 1915,  was slowed significantly after being hit by gunfire from the British battlecruiser squadron under the command of Vice Admiral David Beatty. Rear Admiral Franz von Hipper, the commander of the German squadron, decided to abandon  to the pursuing enemy ships in order to save his more valuable battlecruisers. Under heavy fire from the British ships, she was sunk, and British destroyers began recovering the survivors. However, the destroyers withdrew when a German zeppelin began bombing them, mistaking the sinking  for a British battlecruiser. The number of casualties is unknown, with figures ranging from 747 to around 1,000.  was the only warship lost during the engagement.

Design 

The ships were designed to engage the reconnaissance forces of rival navies, as well as fight in the line of battle. The earliest armored cruiser——was rushed through production specifically to be deployed to China to assist in the suppression of the Boxer Uprising in 1900. Subsequent armored cruisers—with the exception of the two  ships—served with the fleet in the reconnaissance force.

Though the ship would be much larger and more powerful than previous armored cruisers,  retained that designation in an attempt to conceal its more powerful nature. The ship was ordered under the provisional name "E". Her design was influenced by the need to match the armored cruisers which Britain was known to be building at the time. The Germans expected these new British ships to be armed with six or eight  guns. In response, the German navy approved a design with twelve  guns in six twin turrets. This was significantly more firepower than that of the  class, which carried only eight 21 cm guns.

In fact, HMS Invincible carried eight  guns of the same type mounted on battleships. It was soon recognized that these ships were a new type of warship, which eventually came to be classified as the battlecruiser. Despite this,  was typically deployed with the German battlecruiser squadron.

General characteristics 

Her hull was constructed with both transverse and longitudinal steel frames and she had thirteen watertight compartments and a double bottom that ran for approximately 65 percent of the length of the hull.

Documents from the German naval archives generally indicate satisfaction with 's minor pitch and gentle motion at sea. The ship had a standard crew of 41 officers and 812 enlisted men, with an additional 14 officers and 62 sailors when she served as a squadron flagship. She carried a number of smaller vessels, including two picket boats, three barges, two launches, two yawls, and one dinghy.

Propulsion 

 was equipped with three vertical, 4-cylinder triple-expansion steam engines. The ship had a single rudder with which to steer. The three engines were segregated in individual engine rooms. Steam was provided by eighteen coal-fired, marine-type water-tube boilers, which were also divided into three boiler rooms. Electrical power for the ship was supplied by six turbo-generators that provided up to 1,000 kilowatts, rated at 225 volts.

Armament 

 was equipped with twelve  SK L/45 quick-firing guns in six twin turrets, one pair fore and one pair aft, and two pairs in wing turrets on either side of the superstructure. The guns were supplied with a total of 1,020 shells, or 85 rounds per gun. Their rate of fire was 4–5 rounds per minute.

The ship had a secondary battery of eight  quick-firing guns mounted in MPL C/06 casemates, four centered amidships on either side of the vessel. They were supplied with 1320 rounds, for 165 shells per gun, and had a sustained rate of fire of 5–7 rounds per minute.

 was also armed with sixteen  SK L/45 quick-firing guns, placed in both casemates and pivot mounts. Four of these guns were mounted in casemates near the bridge, four in casemates in the bow, another four in casemates at the stern, and the remaining four were mounted in pivot mounts in the rear superstructure. They were supplied with a total of 3,200 rounds, or 200 shells per gun, and could fire at a rate of 15 shells per minute. These guns had a life expectancy of around 7,000 rounds.

 was also equipped with four  torpedo tubes. One was placed in the bow, one in the stern, and the other two were placed on the broadside, all below the waterline. The ship carried a total of 11 torpedoes. The torpedoes carried a  warhead and had two speed settings, which affected the range.

Armor 

As with other German capital ships of the period,  was equipped with Krupp cemented armor. The belt tapered down to zero at either end of the ship. Behind the entire length of the belt armor was an additional  of teak. The armored belt was supplemented by a  torpedo bulkhead, though this only ran between the forward and rear centerline gun turrets.

The forward conning tower was the most heavily armored part of the ship. The central citadel of the ship was protected by  armor. The main battery turrets were 8 cm thick in their roofs, and had 18 cm sides. The 15 cm turret casemates were protected by 14 cm of armor.

Service history 

 was launched on 11 April 1908 and commissioned into the fleet on 1 October 1909. She served as a training ship for naval gunners starting in 1911. The first operation in which  took part was an inconclusive sweep into the Baltic Sea against Russian forces. On 3 September 1914, along with seven pre-dreadnought battleships of the IV Squadron, five cruisers, and 24 destroyers sailed into the Baltic in an attempt to draw out a portion of the Russian fleet and destroy it. The German cruiser attempted to lure the Russian ships back towards  so that she could destroy them, but the Russians refused to take the bait and instead withdrew to the Gulf of Finland. On 9 September, the operation was terminated without any major engagements between the two fleets.

The flotilla arrived off Great Yarmouth at daybreak the following morning and bombarded the port, while the light cruiser  laid a minefield. Shortly thereafter, Hipper ordered his ships to turn back to German waters. On the way, a heavy fog covered the Heligoland Bight, so the ships were ordered to halt until visibility improved and they could safely navigate the defensive minefields. The armored cruiser  made a navigational error that led her into one of the German minefields. She struck two mines and quickly sank; only 127 men out of the crew of 629 were rescued.

Bombardment of Scarborough, Hartlepool, and Whitby 

Admiral Friedrich von Ingenohl, commander of the German High Seas Fleet, decided that another raid on the English coast should be carried out in the hopes of luring a portion of the Grand Fleet into combat where it could be destroyed. The ships sailed north past the island of Heligoland, until they reached the Horns Reef lighthouse, at which point the ships turned west towards Scarborough. Twelve hours after Hipper left the Jade, the High Seas Fleet, consisting of 14 dreadnoughts and eight pre-dreadnoughts and a screening force of two armored cruisers, seven light cruisers, and 54 torpedo boats, departed to provide distant cover for the bombardment force.

On 26 August 1914, the German light cruiser  had run aground in the Gulf of Finland; the wreck was captured by the Russian navy, which found code books used by the German navy, along with navigational charts for the North Sea. These documents were then passed on to the Royal Navy. Room 40 began decrypting German signals, and on 14 December, intercepted messages relating to the plan to bombard Scarborough. The exact details of the plan were unknown, and it was assumed that the High Seas Fleet would remain safely in port, as in the previous bombardment. Vice Admiral Beatty's four battlecruisers, supported by the 3rd Cruiser Squadron and the 1st Light Cruiser Squadron, along with the 2nd Battle Squadron's six dreadnoughts, were to ambush Hipper's battlecruisers.

On the night of 15/16 December, the main body of the High Seas Fleet encountered British destroyers. Fearing the prospect of a nighttime torpedo attack, Admiral Ingenohl ordered the ships to retreat. Hipper was unaware of Ingenohl's reversal, and so he continued with the bombardment. Upon reaching the British coast, Hipper's battlecruisers split into two groups. Of the three towns, only Hartlepool was defended by coastal artillery batteries. By 09:45 on the 16th, the two groups had reassembled, and they began to retreat eastward.

By this time, Beatty's battlecruisers were in position to block Hipper's chosen egress route, while other forces were en route to complete the encirclement. At 12:25, the light cruisers of the II Scouting Group began to pass through the British forces searching for Hipper. One of the cruisers in the 2nd Light Cruiser Squadron spotted  and signaled a report to Beatty. At 12:30, Beatty turned his battlecruisers towards the German ships. Beatty presumed that the German cruisers were the advance screen for Hipper's ships, but the battlecruisers were some  ahead. The 2nd Light Cruiser Squadron, which had been screening for Beatty's ships, detached to pursue the German cruisers, but a misinterpreted signal from the British battlecruisers sent them back to their screening positions. This confusion allowed the German light cruisers to escape and alerted Hipper to the location of the British battlecruisers. The German battlecruisers wheeled to the northeast of the British forces and made good their escape.

Both the British and the Germans were disappointed that they failed to effectively engage their opponents. Admiral Ingenohl's reputation suffered greatly as a result of his timidity. Under the present leadership we will accomplish nothing." The official German history criticized Ingenohl for failing to use his light forces to determine the size of the British fleet, stating: "He decided on a measure which not only seriously jeopardized his advance forces off the English coast but also deprived the German Fleet of a signal and certain victory."

Battle of Dogger Bank 

In early January 1915 the German naval command found out that British ships were conducting reconnaissance in the Dogger Bank area. Admiral Ingenohl was initially reluctant to attempt to destroy these forces, because the I Scouting Group was temporarily weakened while  was in drydock for periodic maintenance.  (counter admiral) Richard Eckermann—the Chief of Staff of the High Seas Fleet—insisted on the operation, and so Ingenohl relented and ordered Hipper to take his battlecruisers to the Dogger Bank.

Each light cruiser had a half-flotilla of torpedo boats attached.

Again, interception and decryption of German wireless signals played an important role. Although they were unaware of the exact plans, the cryptographers of Room 40 were able to deduce that Hipper would be conducting an operation in the Dogger Bank area.

At 08:14,  spotted the light cruiser  and several destroyers from the Harwich Force. Aurora challenged  with a searchlight, at which point  attacked Aurora and scored two hits. Hipper immediately turned his battlecruisers towards the gunfire, when, almost simultaneously,  spotted a large amount of smoke to the northwest of her position. This was identified as a number of large British warships steaming toward Hipper's ships. Hipper later remarked:

At 10:28, Lion was struck on the waterline, which tore a hole in the side of the ship and flooded a coal bunker. At around this time,  scored a hit with a 21 cm shell on Lions forward turret. The shell failed to penetrate the armor, but had concussion effect and temporarily disabled the left gun. Beatty ordered his battlecruisers to engage their German counterparts.

By 11:00,  had been severely damaged after being pounded by numerous heavy shells from the British battlecruisers. At 11:48,  arrived on the scene, and was directed by Beatty to destroy the battered , which was already on fire and listing heavily to port. One of the ship's survivors recounted the destruction that was being wrought:

The British attack was interrupted due to reports of U-boats ahead of the British ships. Beatty quickly ordered evasive maneuvers, which allowed the German ships to increase the distance from their pursuers. Beatty, in the stricken Lion, ordered the remaining battlecruisers to "Engage the enemy's rear", but signal confusion caused the ships to target  alone. She continued to resist stubbornly;  repulsed attacks by the four cruisers of the 1st Light Cruiser Squadron and four destroyers. However, the 1st Light Cruiser Squadron flagship, Aurora, hit  twice with torpedoes. By this time, every main battery gun turret except the rear mount had been silenced. A volley of seven more torpedoes was launched at point-blank range; these hits caused the ship to capsize at 13:13. In the course of the engagement,  had been hit by 70–100 large-caliber shells and several torpedoes.

As the ship was sinking, British destroyers steamed towards her in an attempt to rescue survivors from the water. However, the German zeppelin L5 mistook the sinking  for a British battlecruiser, and tried to bomb the destroyers, which withdrew. Figures vary on the number of casualties; Paul Schmalenbach reported 6 officers of a total of 29 and 275 enlisted men of a complement of 999 were pulled from the water, for a total of 747 men killed. The official German sources examined by Erich Gröner stated that 792 men died when  sank, while James Goldrick referred to British documents, which reported only 234 men survived from a crew of at least 1,200. He later died of pneumonia while in British captivity. A further twenty men would also die as prisoners of war.

Admiral Hipper had originally intended to use his three battlecruisers to turn about and flank the British ships, in order to relieve the battered , but when he learned of the severe damage to his flagship, he decided to abandon the armored cruiser. Hipper later recounted his decision:

By the time Beatty regained control over his ships, having boarded , the German ships had too great a lead for the British to catch them; at 13:50, he broke off the chase. Rear Admiral Eckermann was removed from his post and Admiral Ingenohl was forced to resign. He was replaced by Admiral Hugo von Pohl.

Footnotes

Notes

Citations

References

Online sources

Further reading

 

1908 ships
Cruisers of the Imperial German Navy
Ships built in Kiel
World War I cruisers of Germany
Maritime incidents in 1915
World War I shipwrecks in the North Sea